Cristián Roberto Uribe Lara (born 1 August 1976) is a Chilean former footballer who played as a midfielder.

Uribe was mainly associated with Huachipato and Everton de Viña del Mar, but represented other clubs, amongst them, Colo-Colo and Benfica. He also earned seven caps for Chile, five of those for the under–17 side at the 1995 FIFA World Youth Championship in the United Arab Emirates.

Club career

Early career and Benfica
Born in Concepción, Chile, Uribe began at Huachipato, receiving his first promotion for the first team in 1994, at the age of 18. He established himself as a first team player after good performances in the 1995 FIFA World Youth Championship. In 1999, the 22-year old was loaned for Colo-Colo but did not have a good individual season, as Colo-Colo was going through difficult times, finishing in fourth in the league and having three managers in one season. In January, he went on a second loan deal, but now to Benfica of the Portuguese Liga. 

He made his debut on 9 January in a Derby de Lisboa against Sporting CP. Three days later he scored a double against Amora in the Taça de Portugal and added another on 25th, in a 1–3 loss to Sporting in the same competition.
Uribe played 13 games in half a season, with four goals netted. In the following year, his playing time under José Mourinho was vastly reduced, so he mutually terminated his loan deal in January 2001.

Huachipato and later career
Back at Huachipato, on 3 March 2001, Uribe made his season debut  against Santiago Morning in a Primera División game at Estadio Las Higueras. His only goal came against Unión San Felipe on 6 July and he appeared in 24 games in the tournament. While he lacked goals, Fido Dido was an important player in the club and he extended his contract in 2002, and continued in Talcahuano club until 2003, with a brief stint with Portuguesa in 2002, only leaving at the end the season for Portuguese club Moreirense of the second tier. He made his debut for them on 24 August 2003, against Paços de Ferreira.

After the second spell in Portugal, Uribe returned to Chile in 2004 and represented Deportes La Serena and Concepción in successive years. He joined Everton de Viña del Mar in 2006 and played for them until 2009, when he was released following the club elimination on the 2009 Torneo Clausura Playoffs against Universidad Católica. He finished his career in the following year, after playing for Rangers in the Primera B and San Luis de Quillota of the Primera División, being relegated with the latter.

Honours

Club
Everton de Viña del Mar
 Primera División de Chile: 2008 Apertura

Further reading

References

External links
 
 Uribe at Football Lineups
 
 Cristián Uribe at PlaymakerStats.com

1976 births
Living people
Sportspeople from Concepción, Chile
Chilean footballers
Chilean expatriate footballers
Chile international footballers
Chile under-20 international footballers
Association football midfielders
Chilean Primera División players
C.D. Huachipato footballers
Colo-Colo footballers
Deportes La Serena footballers
Deportes Concepción (Chile) footballers
Everton de Viña del Mar footballers
San Luis de Quillota footballers
Primeira Liga players
S.L. Benfica footballers
Moreirense F.C. players
Campeonato Brasileiro Série A players
Associação Portuguesa de Desportos players
Primera B de Chile players
Rangers de Talca footballers
Chilean expatriate sportspeople in Portugal
Chilean expatriate sportspeople in Brazil
Expatriate footballers in Portugal
Expatriate footballers in Brazil
Chilean football managers
Chilean Primera División managers
Everton de Viña del Mar managers